Ischnolea strandi is a species of beetle in the family Cerambycidae. It was described by Breuning in 1942. It is known from Brazil.

References

Desmiphorini
Beetles described in 1942